Buxton University was an unaccredited vendor of distance education that used a postal address in the United Kingdom. It is associated with the Instantdegrees.com website.

Charter and accreditation status
The institution did not hold a Royal Charter, which is required for an institution in the United Kingdom to call itself a "university", per the Further and Higher Education Act 1992. However, the institution does not advertise itself as a university in the UK and uses a commercial (instead of academic) internet domain name - buxtonuniversity.co.uk.  The domain, however, is registered to a "Camford Institute Subang Jaya" in Singapore.

Buxton claimed accreditation by the World Online Education Accrediting Commission, as well as the Board of Online Universities Accreditation (BOUA), but neither agency is recognized as a higher education accreditor by the United States Department of Education or the Council on Higher Education Accreditation.

Buxton University is on the Texas Higher Education Coordinating Board list of "Institutions Whose Degrees are Illegal to Use in Texas."

History
On its website, Buxton University stated that it was established in 1991 and had awarded a total of 54,000 degrees by 2002.

In August 2004, a San Antonio, Texas, television station investigating bogus academic credentials had an employee order a degree from the InstantDegrees.com website.  The station reported that the employee received a Buxton University master's degree, summa cum laude, by mail within a few days after submitting an order. In November of that year, a Knoxville, Tennessee, television station reported a similar experience in which an employee ordered a Ph.D. from InstantDegrees.com and received a back-dated Buxton University diploma by mail just five days after paying $160. Both stations reported that the university was identified as being in London, but the mail had come from Portugal.

Also in 2004, The Washington Post reported that a hypnotist, William R. Runnells Jr., had called himself "Doctor" and that his degree was from  the American Institute of Hypnotherapy and Buxton University. In that article, the Post wrote, "...repeated Web searches and several calls to overseas operators did not turn up a listing for a Buxton University."

On November 29, 2006, the web version of NBC 4 in Columbus, Ohio, posted a transcript of a Target 4 Investigates program in which Kyle Anderson stated that "Five days after placing that order, I received this in the mail - global priority mail from Portugal. Inside, two signed and sealed diplomas from Buxton University in London, England.  So for a few hundred bucks, I've got a Ph.D. in counseling, a master's of divinity in religion, some pretty official-looking letters from Buxton University, and their prospectus, which looks like it's printed on an ink-jet printer."

 Buxton University has no web presence and appears to have ceased trading.

According to the Higher Education Degree Datacheck website, Buxton University is not a valid UK degree awarding body.

See also
 Diploma mill
 List of unaccredited institutions of higher learning

References

External links
 Buxton University official website

Unaccredited institutions of higher learning
Distance education institutions based in the United Kingdom